Margaret Holland Sargent (born December 30, 1927), also known as Meg Sargent, is an American portrait artist based in Los Angeles, California. She has painted over three hundred oil portraits, including portraits of Tennessee Williams, Gerald Ford, Jimmy Carter and Margaret Thatcher.

Background
Sargent's father, Cecil Holland, was a character actor and theatrical makeup artist.  He has been cited as influential on her career. Sargent traveled extensively as an adult with her husband, a career military officer. She studied acting and costume design at the University of California at Los Angeles and is a member of Kappa Delta sorority.

Herbert Abrams introduced Sargent to oil painting in the 1960s and she continued to study with John Howard Sanden in the 1970s at the Art Students League of New York.   She first painted in a spare bedroom of her home, eventually developing a freestanding studio on her property.

Career 
Sargent is a skilled businesswoman who has promoted herself throughout her career, employing portfolios, flyers, a website and print advertisements.  She has used computers and digital cameras in her work since 1997.

Sargent has frequently painted portraits of officers from the U.S. military, such as Alexander Haig, James Stockdale  She is known for painting many of the first women officers in the United States military, including Kristin Baker (first Captain at West Point), first woman graduate from West Point (Andrea Hollen), and the first female chaplain in the armed forces, Dianna Pohlman Bell. She painted Mary Maxwell Gates' portrait. Her artwork of Dorothy Stimson Bullitt was used as cover art for Delphine Haley's book, Dorothy Stimson Bullitt: An Uncommon Life. 

Sargent was the first female member of the Salmagundi Club, the American Portrait Society, and the Council of Leading American Portrait Painters.

Throughout her painting career, Sargent has acted in movies, television, and commercials.

Professional organizations
 American Portrait Society
 The American Society of Portrait Artists
 Council of Leading American Portrait Painters
 Painters Club of New York
 Salmagundi Club

References

External links
 Official Website of Margaret Holland Sargent
 2016 video interview of Margaret Holland Sargent

1927 births
Living people
People from Hollywood, Los Angeles
Artists from Los Angeles
American women painters
Painters from California
American portrait painters
20th-century American painters
21st-century American painters
20th-century American women artists
21st-century American women artists
Art Students League of New York alumni